Susan M. Orsega is an American nurse and rear admiral who served as the acting Surgeon General of the United States from January 20 to March 4, 2021. Orsega is one of the first nurses to serve in the position. She is currently the Director of Commissioned Corps Headquarters (CCHQ), tasked with the administration of the members of the U.S. Public Health Service Commissioned Corps. Prior to becoming acting Surgeon General, Orsega was the Chief Nurse Officer of the USPHS from 2016 until 2019.

Early life and education 
Orsega was raised in Whitehall, Allegheny County, Pennsylvania and graduated from Baldwin High School. She matriculated at Towson University, earning a Bachelor of Science in Nursing before going on to enroll in the Uniformed Services University of the Health Sciences, where she would earn a master's degree in science.

Career 
In 1989, Orsega began her career at the National Institutes of Health studying as a nurse practitioner concerning the subject of HIV/AIDS. Before being selected by President Joe Biden to take the position as acting Surgeon General, she worked at the National Institute of Allergy and Infectious Diseases.

References 

Surgeons General of the United States
United States Public Health Service
United States Public Health Service Commissioned Corps admirals
United States Public Health Service Commissioned Corps
Year of birth missing (living people)
Living people